Polish anarchy can refer to:
  Anarchism in Poland
 the inefficient government of the late 17th / early 18th century Polish–Lithuanian Commonwealth (see Golden Liberty, liberum veto)